Ypthima bolanica, the desert fourring, is a butterfly in the family Nymphalidae. It is found in Pakistan and northern Oman.

References

bolanica
Butterflies of Asia
Insects of the Middle East
Butterflies described in 1883